The South Maroubra Surf Life Saving Club is one of Australia's oldest Surf Life Saving Clubs, founded in 1963. The club was established in 1963 the Club is situated at the Southern end of Maroubra Beach in Sydney.

See also

Surf lifesaving
Surf Life Saving Australia
List of Australian surf lifesaving clubs

References

External links
 

1963 establishments in Australia
Sports clubs established in 1963
Surf Life Saving Australia clubs
Sporting clubs in Sydney
Maroubra, New South Wales